"Disillusion" is the seventh episode of the fifth and final series of the period drama Upstairs, Downstairs. It first aired on 19 October 1975 on ITV.

Background
Disillusion was recorded in the studio on 3 and 4 April 1975, and was the final appearance of Karen Dotrice as Lily Hawkins.

Cast
Gordon Jackson - Hudson
Jean Marsh - Rose
Angela Baddeley - Mrs Bridges
Lesley-Anne Down - Georgina Worsley
David Langton - Richard Bellamy
Hannah Gordon - Virginia Bellamy
Karen Dotrice - Lily 
Christopher Beeny - Edward
Jenny Tomasin - Ruby
Gareth Hunt - Frederick
Jacqueline Tong - Daisy

Plot
It is spring 1924, and Georgina returns from New York City, having stayed with Elizabeth. Meanwhile, Daisy gets annoyed when Lily is given time off to go shopping by Mr Hudson. A few days later, while at the Wembley Exhibition, Georgina spots Hudson and Lily together holding hands. That evening she tells Virginia what she saw, and Virginia then asks Rose if Lily is seeing any one. Rose says she knows nothing, but then goes to see Lily and asks her if she is going out with Mr Hudson. Lily confirms this and tells Rose how he has taken her to concerts and museums. Very soon, the whole house knows what has been going on.

Hudson explains to Mrs Bridges that Lily brings him hope and joy, and he tells Virginia that he has "very deep feelings" for her. Mrs Bridges is upset, as she and Hudson had agreed that one day they would marry. Hudson soon decides to resign and gives four weeks notice. Hudson wants to go with Lily on Sunday to see her mother in Banbury to ask for Lily's hand in marriage, however Lily cannot bring herself to tell him that she does not love him. On the Sunday morning, having spoken to Georgina, Lily talks to Hudson, and hurts him by saying insulting him and calling him boring.

The following morning, Lily leaves 165, Eaton Place without telling anyone and goes back to live with her mother. She leaves a note for Mr Hudson, explaining she did not mean the hurtful things she said the day before, she only wanted to stop him caring for her. Hudson then withdraws his resignation, and Virginia writes a very good reference for Lily.

References
Richard Marson, "Inside UpDown - The Story of Upstairs, Downstairs", Kaleidoscope Publishing, 2005
Updown.org.uk - Upstairs, Downstairs Fansite

Upstairs, Downstairs (series 5) episodes
1975 British television episodes
Fiction set in 1924